Future Games, subtitled "A Magical Kahauna Dream", was the fourth album that Spirit released for Mercury Records, and their ninth album overall. However, it is practically a Randy California solo album in all but name, as he played most of the instruments (Ed Cassidy was on drums) and did most of the writing throughout the album. Coming off as a slightly warped science fiction version of Spirit of '76, it has been released several times on CD.

Track listing 
All songs written by Randy California except where noted.

Personnel

Spirit 
Terry Anderson - Vocals
Randy California - Guitar, vocals, bass
Ed Cassidy - Drums, percussion
Joe Kotleba - Synthesizer

Production 
Blair Mooney - Engineer
Jim Schubert - Art Direction
Wally Traugott - Mastering

References 

Spirit (band) albums
1977 albums
Mercury Records albums